The William Cullen Bryant Viaduct, historically known as the Roslyn Viaduct, is a viaduct that carries Northern Boulevard (NY 25A) over Hempstead Harbor between the Incorporated Villages of Flower Hill and Roslyn, in Nassau County, on Long Island, in New York, United States. It serves as a bypass of Roslyn's downtown. The original bridge opened in 1949, and was replaced between 2005 and 2012.

History

Original bridge (1949-2012) 
The original bridge was completed in 1949, and opened on October 21 of that year by Governor Thomas E. Dewey. The four-lane bridge was built using a pin-hanger design. The construction and subsequent opening of the bridge eliminated the traffic bottleneck on Main Street and Old Northern Boulevard in the heart of Roslyn that had resulted from the increasing number of automobiles on the roads. 

By the 1990s, the bridge was beginning to show its age. Advancements in bridge engineering and safety rendered the structure obsolete; New York stopped building bridges using the pin-hanger design in 1968.  Additionally, there were concerns regarding the bridge's structural integrity, especially after the 1983 Mianus River Bridge Disaster, in which a similarly-designed bridge carrying Interstate 95 in Connecticut collapsed. After careful consideration, officials ultimately decided to replace the bridge, with initial development for the project first taking place between 1992 and 1993.

Current bridge (2012-present) 
In 2005, construction commenced on a replacement bridge, as the original one was in a state of disrepair, was structurally-obsolete, lacked shoulders, and exceeded its intended use life. Given the lack of efficient detour routes, construction was carried out in phases; one side would remain open whilst the other was demolished and rebuilt. Three lanes would be in use at any given time, and their directions would be reversible; in the mornings, there would be 2 westbound lanes and 1 eastbound lane, and the afternoons/evenings would see 2 eastbound lanes and 1 westbound lane. Construction was originally intended to be completed by 2007 - but numerous factors led to multiple delays, and the replacement bridge was finally completed in 2012. The new bridge features many enhancements, including a shoulder lane, an improved walkway, and better drainage. The new bridge is a total of 13 feet (4 Meters) wider than its predecessor.

The new bridge was built using precast concrete segments, and was the first bridge in the area to be built using this design method.

Dedication and re-naming, 2012 
In 2012, the bridge was officially dedicated to and renamed after the late poet, journalist, and Roslyn resident, William Cullen Bryant, by then-NY State Senator Jack Martins, through a bill in the New York State Senate. Bryant, who had purchased a home in Roslyn in 1843, was one of the most famous and influential residents in Roslyn's history.

See also 

 NY 25A
 Roslyn, New York
 Hempstead Harbor

References 

Roslyn, New York
Town of North Hempstead, New York
Bridges in Nassau County, New York
Road bridges in New York (state)
Transportation buildings and structures in Nassau County, New York